The 2008 Six Nations Under 20s Championship was the first Six Nations Under 20s Championship, a rugby union competition for under-20 national teams, played between February and March 2008. This was the first competition of the new under-20s tournament, following the merger of the under-19 and under-21 tournaments. England won the tournament along with the Grand Slam and Triple Crown.

Table

Results

Round 1

Round 2

Round 3

Round 4

Round 5

Top try scorers 
Noah Cato (ENG) – 6

Leigh Halfpenny (WAL) – 3

Zagar, Bastareaud (both FRA), Strain (SCO), Stegmann, Ellis, Cox, Eves (all ENG) – 2

External links
Historic results at sixnationsrugby.com
Historic tables at sixnationsrugby.com

2008
U-20 Six Nations
2007–08 in English rugby union
2007–08 in French rugby union
2007–08 in Irish rugby union
2007–08 in Welsh rugby union
2007–08 in Scottish rugby union
2007–08 in Italian rugby union
U-20 
February 2008 sports events in Europe
March 2008 sports events in Europe